The Korherr Report is a 16-page document on the progress of the Holocaust in German-controlled Europe. It was delivered to Heinrich Himmler on March 23, 1943, by the chief inspector of the statistical bureau of the SS and professional statistician Dr Richard Korherr under the title die Endlösung der Judenfrage, in English the Final Solution to the Jewish Question. Commissioned by Himmler, Korherr calculated that, from 1937 to December 1942, the number of Jews in Europe had fallen by 4 million. Between October 1939 and December 31, 1942 (see, page 9 of the Report), 1,274,166 million Jews had been "processed" at the camps of the General Government (Occupied Poland) and 145,301 at the camps in Warthegau (location of Kulmhof).

The decrease of Soviet Russian Jews from the territories overrun in Operation Barbarossa was not included due to lack of statistical data. The summaries came from the RSHA office receiving all SS reports about the so-called "already evacuated" Jews. Their "special treatment" was removed from the document on the request of Himmler who intended to share it with Hitler, and replaced by Korherr with "processed".

Significance 
The initial report, sixteen pages long, was submitted on March 23, 1943. On Himmler's request an abridged version, six-and-a-half pages long, was updated to March 31, 1943. The full report summarized how many Jews remained in Germany, Austria and Europe; detailed the numbers of Jews detained in the Nazi concentration camps; how many Jews had died natural deaths since 1933; and how many Jews had been evacuated to the eastern territories. Himmler accepted the full report on a confidential basis, but for the abridged estimate, made Korherr change the word "Sonderbehandlung" or "special treatment," to the word "durchgeschleust" or "processed." The report calculated that, from 1937 to December 1942, the number of Jews in Europe had fallen by 4 million.

Korherr ascribed this fall to "emigration, partially due to the excess mortality of the Jews in Central and Western Europe, partially due to the evacuations especially in the more strongly populated Eastern Territories, which are here counted as ongoing."

By way of explanation, Korherr added that

It must not be overlooked in this respect that of the deaths of Soviet Russian Jews in the occupied Eastern territories only a part was recorded, whereas deaths in the rest of European Russia and at the front are not included at all. In addition there are movements of Jews inside Russia to the Asian part which are unknown to us. The movement of Jews from the European countries outside the German influence is also of a largely unknown order of magnitude. On the whole European Jewry should since 1933, i.e. in the first decade of National Socialist German power, have lost almost half of its population.

Post-war
Korherr denied all knowledge of the Holocaust, saying that he had "only heard about exterminations after the collapse in 1945."

In a letter he sent to the German magazine Der Spiegel in July 1977, Korherr said that he had not written the report on Himmler's order" and that the

statement that I had mentioned that over a million Jews had died in the camps of the Generalgouvernement and the Warthegau through special treatment is also inaccurate. I must protest against the word 'died' in this context.  It was the very word 'Sonderbehandlung' ['special treatment'] that led me to call the RSHA by phone and ask what this word meant. I was given the answer that these were Jews who were settled in the Lublin district.

See also

 Jäger Report, 1941
 Einsatzgruppen reports, 1941–1942
 Wilhelm Cornides Report, 1942
 Wannsee Conference, 1942
 Katzmann Report, 1943
 Gerstein Report, 1945
 Riegner Telegram, 1942
 Höfle Telegram with Einsatz Reinhardt arrivals, 1943
 Special Prosecution Book-Poland, 1937–1939

Notes

References
 Korherr Report online
 Korherr Report, Nuremberg documents, NO 5192-4
 Korherr-Bericht, lange Fassung originals (German)
 Götz Aly, Karl Heinz Roth: Die restlose Erfassung. Volkszählen, Identifizieren, Aussondern im Nationalsozialismus. Frankfurt/M. 2005,  (germ.)
 Gerald Roberts Reitlinger, Johann Wolfgang Brügel: Die Endlösung. Hitlers Versuch der Ausrottung der Juden Europas 1939–1945. (1. Ed. English 1953 The Final Solution: The Attempt to Exterminate the Jews of Europe, 1939-1945. 1987 - ), Berlin, Colloquium 1. dt. Aufl. - 1956,  7. Ed. 1992, Copress - paperb.ed 1983.  700 p. 

Holocaust historical documents
Einsatzgruppen
1943 documents